Effelder is a  tributary river of the Itz in the districts of Sonneberg (Thuringia) and Coburg (Bavaria). It flows into the Froschgrundsee, which is drained by the Itz, near Schönstädt.

See also
List of rivers of Bavaria
List of rivers of Thuringia

References

Rivers of Bavaria
Rivers of Thuringia
Rivers of Germany